Telford is a constituency represented in the House of Commons of the UK Parliament since May 2015 by Lucy Allan, a Conservative, who defeated David Wright, the former Labour Party MP for the seat.

Members of Parliament

Constituency profile
The constituency is generally urban and covers Telford New Town. There is a significant technology sector. Residents are slightly poorer than the UK average.

Boundaries

Telford is made up of several old industrial towns to the north of the River Severn and on the eastern flanks of the Wrekin (including Madeley, Dawley and the small townships in the Ironbridge Gorge) and numerous New Town developments including Woodside. However, not all of the Telford New Town developments are in the constituency; the northern parts and some western areas (including the town of Wellington) which pre-dates Telford, are in The Wrekin constituency.

All of the constituency is covered by Telford and Wrekin Council.

2010–present: The Borough of Telford and Wrekin wards of Brookside, Cuckoo Oak, Dawley Magna, Horsehay and Lightmoor, Ironbridge Gorge, Ketley and Oakengates, Lawley and Overdale, Madeley, Malinslee, Priorslee, St George's, The Nedge, Woodside, Wrockwardine Wood, and Trench.

1997–2010: The District of The Wrekin wards of Brookside, Cuckoo Oak, Dawley Magna, Hollinswood/Randlay, Ironbridge (The Gorge), Ketley Bank, Langley, Lawley, Madeley, Malinslee, Priorslee, Stirchley, Wombridge, Woodside, and Wrockwardine Wood.

Boundary changes to realign the constituency boundaries to fit with the borough's most recent ward revisions resulted in the addition of Ketley (from the constituency of The Wrekin) for the 2010 general election.

Future proposals: Under constituency boundary changes announced in September 2016, ahead of the then next general election, it was proposed to extend the constituency to include the wards of Donnington and Hadley and Leegomery, to be taken from The Wrekin constituency.

History
Created from the more rural Wrekin constituency for the 1997 general election, Telford was continuously held by the Labour Party, with a change in candidate in 2001, until the 2015 general election when the Conservatives took the seat from David Wright. Bruce Grocott was its first-ever MP, serving for the first four years.  In 2010 Wright's majority fell to a marginal figure of 981 votes, and he lost in 2015 by 730 votes - one of the small number of Conservative gains from Labour in that election, which in turn helped to give the Conservatives an overall parliamentary majority. The seat was retained by Lucy Allan in 2017 with an almost identical majority of 720, and again by Ms Allan in December 2019 with a majority of 10,941, one of the most significant Conservative marginal seat holds in that election.

Elections

Elections in the 2010s

Elections in the 2000s

Elections in the 1990s

See also
 Parliamentary constituencies in Shropshire

Notes

References

Parliamentary constituencies in Shropshire
Constituencies of the Parliament of the United Kingdom established in 1997
Telford and Wrekin